This article presents a list of the historical events and publications of Australian literature during 2002.

Major publications

Literary fiction

 J. M. Coetzee – Youth: Scenes from Provincial Life II
 Bryce Courtenay – Matthew Flinders' Cat
 Andrea Goldsmith – The Prosperous Thief
 Sonya Hartnett – Of a Boy
 Sarah Hay – Skins
 Chloe Hooper – A Child's Book of True Crime
 Kate Jennings – Moral Hazard
 Gail Jones – Black Mirror
 Thomas Keneally – An Angel in Australia
 Colleen McCullough – The October Horse
 Alex Miller – Journey to the Stone Country
 Dorothy Porter – Wild Surmise
 Eva Sallis – The City of Sealions

Children's and Young Adult fiction

 J. C. Burke – White Lies
 Isobelle Carmody – Darksong
 Alison Croggon – The Gift
 Mem Fox – The Magic Hat
 Marieke Hardy – Short Cuts
 Richard Harland – Ferren and the White Doctor
 Lian Hearn – Across the Nightingale Floor
 Maureen McCarthy – When You Wake and Find Me Gone
 Meme McDonald and Boori Pryor – Njunjul the Sun
 David Metzenthen – Wildlight: A Journey
 Kirsty Murray – Walking Home with Marie-Claire
 Gillian Rubinstein – The Whale's Child
 Markus Zusak – The Messenger

Crime

 Carmel Bird – Open for Inspection
 Kirsty Brooks – Lady Luck
 Jon Cleary – The Easy Sin
 Jane Clifton – Half Past Dead
 Peter Corris – Salt and Blood
 Kerry Greenwood – Murder in Montparnasse
 Gabrielle Lord – Baby Did a Bad Bad Thing
 Barry Maitland – Babel
 Shane Maloney – Something Fishy 
 Tara Moss – Split 
 Alex Palmer – Blood Redemption
 Peter Temple – In The Evil Day

Romance

 Lilian Darcy – For the Taking
 Barbara Hannay
 A Bride at Birralee
 Their Doorstep Baby
 Di Morrissey – Kimberley Sun
 Valerie Parv
 The Baron and the Bodyguard
 The Marquis and the Mother-To-Be

Science Fiction and Fantasy

 Damien Broderick – Transcension
 Trudi Canavan – The Novice
 Cecilia Dart-Thornton
 The Battle of Evernight
 The Lady of the Sorrows
 Sara Douglass
 The Crippled Angel
 Hades' Daughter
 Ian Irvine – Tetrarch
 Fiona McIntosh
 Destiny
 Revenge
 Sean McMullen – Voyage of the Shadowmoon
 Juliet Marillier – Wolfskin
 Sean Williams
 Echoes of Earth with Shane Dix
 The Sky Warden and the Sun
 The Storm Weaver and the Sand

Drama

David Brown – Eating Ice Cream With Your Eyes Closed
 Nick Enright
 Country Music
 A Man with Five Children
 Michael Gow – The Fortunes of Richard Mahony
 Michael Gurr – The Simple Truth
 Daniel Keene – Half and Half
 Jenny Kemp – Still Angela
 Joanna Murray-Smith – Rapture
 David Williamson – Soulmates

Poetry

 M. T. C. Cronin – My Lover's Back : 79 Love Poems
 Robert Gray – Afterimages
 Jill Jones – Screens Jets Heaven: New and Selected Poems
 Emma Lew – Anything the Landlord Touches
 Kate Lilley – Versary
 Les Murray
Collected Poems : 1961–2002
 Poems the Size of Photographs

Non-fiction

 Bruce Bennett, Australian Short Fiction: A History
Anna Funder – Stasiland
 Mark McKenna – Looking for Blackfellas' Point : An Australian History of Place
 Ashley Mallett – The Black Lords of Summer : The Story of the 1868 Aboriginal Tour of England and Beyond
 John Marsden – The Boy You Brought Home : A Single Mother's Guide to Raising Boys

Biographies

 Nick Bleszynski – Shoot Straight, You Bastards! : The Truth Behind the Killing of 'Breaker' Morant
 Barry Dickins – Black and Whiteley : Barry Dickins in Search of Brett
 Ann Galbally – Charles Conder : The Last Bohemian
 Barry Hill – Broken Song : T. G. H. Strehlow and Aboriginal Possession
 Thomas Keneally – American Scoundrel : The Life of the Notorious Civil War General Dan Sickles
 Ross McMullin – Pompey Elliott
 Brenda Niall – The Boyds : A Family Biography
 Don Watson – Recollections of a Bleeding Heart : A Portrait of Paul Keating PM

Awards and honours

Note: these awards were presented in the year in question.

Lifetime achievement

Fiction

International

National

Children and Young Adult

National

Crime and Mystery

National

Science Fiction

Non-Fiction

Poetry

Drama

Deaths

 21 May – Dorothy Hewett, poet (born 1923)
 27 May – Ray Mathew, poet and novelist (born 1929)
 6 June – Peter Cowan, short story writer and literary editor (born 1914)
 13 September – J. E. Macdonnell, novelist (born 1917)
 2 October – R. A. Simpson, poet (born 1929)
 8 December – Gary Catalano, poet and critic (born 1947)

See also
 2002 in Australia
 2002 in literature
 2002 in poetry
 List of years in literature
 List of years in Australian literature

References

Note: all references relating to awards can, or should be, found on the relevant award's page.

Australian literature by year
Literature
21st-century Australian literature
2002 in literature